Pietro Sassoli (1898–1946) was an Italian composer and conductor. He worked on a number of films during his career, including Alessandro Blasetti's Mother Earth (1931). He also worked on some early Roberto Rossellini films.

Selected filmography
 Courtyard (1931)
 Court of Assizes (1931)
 Mother Earth (1931)
 The Opera Singer (1932)
 The Ambassador (1936)
 Ettore Fieramosca (1938)
 A Pilot Returns (1942)
 Odessa in Flames (1942)
 The Man with a Cross (1943)
 Rita of Cascia (1943)

References

Bibliography 
 Verdone, Luca. I film di Alessandro Blasetti. Gremese Editore, 1989.

External links 
 

1898 births
1946 deaths
People from the Province of Rovigo
Italian male composers
20th-century Italian composers
20th-century Italian male musicians